The 1914 Ottawa Rough Riders finished in 4th place in the Interprovincial Rugby Football Union with a 0–6 record and failed to qualify for the playoffs. This was the first time in franchise history that the Rough Riders finished without a win in regular season play.

Regular season

Standings

Schedule

References

Ottawa Rough Riders seasons